The Doctor Who Polystyle comic strip was the first comic strip devoted to the long-running British science fiction television series Doctor Who, and the first original spin-off media from the show. The strip was launched in TV Comic on 14 November 1964, less than a year after the television series began broadcasting. TV Comic was issued weekly, and one of a number of titles belonging to Polystyle Publications Ltd, the comic exclusively featuring strips based on television series.

In 1971, the Doctor Who strip moved to another Polystyle publication, Countdown comic, for its launch. Countdown soon began amalgamating other Polystyle comics and went through a number of renamings, before in turn being amalgamated into TV Comic in 1973 (itself then going through a number of name changes). The Doctor Who comic strip survived all the changes and ran for 15 years in nearly every issue mainly in episodic format, with the last instalment appearing on 11 May 1979.

During this time, the strip also featured in various Polystyle produced holiday specials, annuals, and giveaways. Accordingly, this period has become known as the 'Polystyle era'.

History 

TV Comic was a British comic book magazine published weekly from 9 November 1951 until 29 June 1984. It was originally published by News of the World before "passing in turn to Beaverbrook Newspapers, [then] TV Publications," which changed its name to Polystyle Publications Ltd in March 1968. From the off, the comic featured stories based on television series running at the time of publication. The first issue ran to eight pages and had Muffin the Mule on the front cover. It also featured many other TV favorites of the day, including Mr. Pastry, Larry the Lamb, Tom Puss, Prince Valiant (Hal Foster reprint), Jack & Jill and Prudence Kitten.

The Doctor Who comic strip began in issue 674 of TV Comic, which went on sale on Monday 8 November 1964, with a cover date of 14 November 1964. It featured a story with the First Doctor titled "The Klepton Parasites". Mirroring the television series, the First Doctor was a likeness of actor William Hartnell. However, the character was known as "Dr. Who", and traveled with his grandchildren John and Gillian, who had never appeared in televised Doctor Who.

Polystyle comics

Polystyle parallel publications  

The Doctor Who strip also appeared in a number of Polystyle holiday specials, annuals, and giveaways:

 TV Comic Holiday Special [1965]
 TV Comic Annual 1966
 TV Comic Holiday Special [1966]
 TV Comic Annual 1967
 TV Comic Holiday Special [1967]
 TV Comic Annual 1968
 TV Comic Holiday Special [1968]
 TV Comic Annual 1969
 TV Comic Holiday Special [1969]
 TV Comic Annual 1970
 TV Comic Holiday Special [1970]
 TV Comic Annual 1971
 Countdown Annual 1972
 Countdown for TV Action Annual 1973
 Doctor Who Holiday Special [1973]
 TV Action Annual 1974
 TV Comic Annual 1975
 Doctor Who Holiday Special
 TV Comic Annual 1976
 TV Comic Annual 1977
 Mighty Midget Doctor Who Comic (Free with Issue 1292 of Mighty TV Comic)
 Mighty TV Comic Holiday Special 1977
 Mighty TV Comic Annual 1978
 Doctor Who Winter Special [1977]
 TV Comic Holiday Special 1978
 TV Comic Annual 1979

 Content 

 First Doctor Polystyle strips 

The first artist to portray the Doctor in TV Comic was Neville Main. These strips appeared over two pages, and were in black and white. According to Doctor Who historian Jeremy Bentham, "Main's artwork was very simplistic in style, consisting of basic line illustrations drawn in a very cartoonish way. During his 45-week stint on the strip he never quite captured the likeness of Hartnell [...] He was, however, quite an inventive storywriter." After about a year, Bill Mevin took over the strip, which now began to appear in full colour. After six months with Mevin at the helm, the strip passed to John Canning, at which point the strip returned to black and white.

 First Doctor Polystyle strips

 Second Doctor Polystyle strips 

The first strip to feature the Second Doctor, Patrick Troughton, came with TV Comic issue 784 (24 December 1966). "No reason whatsoever," writes Jeremy Bentham, "was given for his sudden change of appearance." The artist continued to be John Canning.

 Second Doctor Polystyle strips

 Third Doctor Polystyle strips 

After nine stories in TV Comic, the Doctor Who strip ceased in this publication. As Jeremy Bentham writes, however, this was because "it had found a much better home to go to." Polystyle launched Countdown with a rebooted Doctor Who strip, now in full colour on glossy paper. As John Ainsworth writes that the new strip "was a complete departure from the TV Comic version." This was due to the high standard of writing and illustration, as much as the production values. However, within a year Polystyle found they could not sustain the quality of the publication as it was too costly, and so rebooted the publication as TV Action with a cheaper-to-produce format. However, TV Action also eventually proved too costly, and was wound up in August 1973. At that point, the strip returned to its original home, TV Comic.

 Third Doctor Polystyle strips

 Fourth Doctor Polystyle strips 

The Fourth Doctor comic strip launched in TV Comic in issue 1204 (11 January 1975). "As with the switch between Hartnell and Troughton," writes Jeremy Bentham, "there was no actual strip changeover story although this time the first panel of the Baker story 'Death Flower' contained a two- paragraph synopsis [...] introducing readers to the new Doctor."

 Fourth Doctor Polystyle strips

 End of Doctor Who strip 

Paul Scoones, an historian of the Doctor Who comic strip, writes that Polystyle "held the rights to publish a Doctor Who comic [strip] until May 1979 when the last installment of the strip appeared [...] Once relinquished by Polystyle, the rights were soon snapped up by Marvel UK, who created their own ongoing comic [strip]. This new strip [...] continues to this day" in Doctor Who Magazine.

See also
 List of Doctor Who comic stories
 First Doctor comic stories
 Second Doctor comic stories
 Third Doctor comic stories
 Fourth Doctor comic strips
 Fifth Doctor comic stories
 Sixth Doctor comic stories
 Seventh Doctor comic stories
 Eighth Doctor comic stories
 Ninth Doctor comic stories
 Eleventh Doctor comic stories
 Twelfth Doctor comic stories
 Thirteenth Doctor comic stories
 Dalek comic strips, illustrated annuals and graphic novels
 Doctor Who Adventures Doctor Who – Battles in Time Torchwood Magazine:Category:Doctor Who comic strip characters

References
General

Ainsworth, John, "Behind the Frame" [I: Polystyle strips (1960s)] in Doctor Who Classic Comics [Issue 1], 9 December 1992, pp. 20–21
Ainsworth, John, "Behind the Frame" [II: Polystyle strips (1970–72)] in Doctor Who Classic Comics [Issue 2], 6 January 1993, pp. 18–19
Ainsworth, John, "Behind the Frame" [III: Polystyle strips (1972–75)] in Doctor Who Classic Comics [Issue 3], 3 February 1993, pp. 34–35
Ainsworth, John, "Behind the Frame" [IV: Polystyle strips (1975–76)] in Doctor Who Classic Comics [Issue 4], 3 March 1993, pp. 16–17
Ainsworth, John, "Behind the Frame" [V: Polystyle strips (1976–79)] in Doctor Who Classic Comics [Issue 5], 31 March 1993, pp. 36–37
Ainsworth, John, "Frame Count" [I: First Doctor Polystyle strips] in Doctor Who Classic Comics [Issue 1], 9 December 1992, p. 19
Ainsworth, John, "Frame Count" [II: Second Doctor Polystyle strips] in Doctor Who Classic Comics [Issue 2], 6 January 1993, p. 17
Ainsworth, John, "Frame Count" [III: Third Doctor Polystyle strips 1] in Doctor Who Classic Comics [Issue 3], 3 February 1993, p. 33
Ainsworth, John, "Frame Count" [IV: Third Doctor Polystyle strips 2] in Doctor Who Classic Comics [Issue 4], 3 March 1993, p. 15
Ainsworth, John, "Frame Count" [V: Fourth Doctor Polystyle strips] in Doctor Who Classic Comics [Issue 5], 31 March 1993, p. 35
Bentham, Jeremy, "Doctor Who Comics"/"Comics Checklist" [Polystyle First Doctor] in Doctor Who Monthly (Issue 62), March 1982, pp. 15–18; 23
Bentham, Jeremy, "Doctor Who Comics"/"Comics Checklist" [Polystyle Second Doctor] in Doctor Who Monthly (Issue 63), April 1982, pp. 34–37; 38
Bentham, Jeremy, "Doctor Who Comics"/"Comics Checklist" [Polystyle Third Doctor - Part 1] in Doctor Who Monthly (Issue 64), May 1982, pp. 29–31; 32
Bentham, Jeremy, "Doctor Who Comics"/"Comics Checklist" [Polystyle Third Doctor - Part 2] in Doctor Who Monthly (Issue 65), June 1982, pp. 33–37; 38
Bentham, Jeremy, "Doctor Who Comics"/"Comics Checklist" [Polystyle Fourth Doctor] in Doctor Who Monthly (Issue 66), July 1982, pp. 33–36; 37-38
Scoones, Paul, The Comic Strip Companion: The Unofficial and Unauthorised Guide to Doctor Who in Comics: 1964-1979'', Prestatyn: Telos, 2012

Specific

Comics based on Doctor Who
British comic strips
1964 comics debuts
Comics characters introduced in 1964